Longbenton is a Tyne and Wear Metro station, serving the Freeman Hospital and suburb of Longbenton, North Tyneside in Tyne and Wear, England. It joined the network on 11 August 1980, following the opening of the first phase of the network, between Haymarket and Tynemouth via Four Lane Ends.

History 
The station originally opened in July 1947, under the London and North Eastern Railway, which operated electric suburban passenger services on the North Tyneside Loop – known as the Tyneside Electrics. The original neoclassical station building was joined by a covered concrete footbridge and waiting rooms in the late 1950s, all of which were frequent targets for vandals by the 1970s.

Following closure for conversion in the late 1970s, a number of alterations were made to the station, including the shortening of platforms, construction of a new footbridge with spiral ramps to improve wheelchair access, and installation of new signage and ticket machines.

After the initial conversion work, the station buildings remained largely unchanged until 1999, when extensive refurbishment work took place. A new ticket hall was added on the eastbound platforms, and related aesthetic changes were made to the original footbridge constructed by the London and North Eastern Railway. The 1940s station building on the westbound platforms of the station was also upgraded and refurbished.

In 2001, Tag-Tile, an artwork designed by Rob Belilios and Simon Jones, was commissioned for the station. The artwork was created with the involvement of local young people, in response to graffiti issues at the station. The station also features Journey's Echo, a collection of artwork created in collaboration with sixth form students from the nearby secondary school, which was commissioned in 1999.

Facilities 
Step-free access is available at all stations across the Tyne and Wear Metro network, with ramped access to platforms. Ramps also provide step-free access over the footbridge between platforms. The station is equipped with ticket machines, waiting shelter, seating, next train information displays, timetable posters, and an emergency help point on both platforms. Ticket machines are able to accept payment with credit and debit card (including contactless payment), notes and coins. The station is also fitted with smartcard validators, which feature at all stations across the network. A small newsagent's shop is housed within the station building, on the westbound platform (trains towards South Shields).

There is no dedicated car parking available at the station. There is the provision for cycle parking, with five cycle pods available for use.

Services 
, the station is served by up to five trains per hour on weekdays and Saturday, and up to four trains per hour during the evening and on Sunday.

Rolling stock used: Class 599 Metrocar

References

External links
 
 Timetable and station information for Longbenton



Metropolitan Borough of North Tyneside
Newcastle upon Tyne
1947 establishments in England
Railway stations in Great Britain opened in 1947
1980 establishments in England
Railway stations in Great Britain opened in 1980
Tyne and Wear Metro Yellow line stations
Transport in Tyne and Wear
Former London and North Eastern Railway stations